Joel Edward McHale (born November 20, 1971) is an American actor, comedian, and television host. He is best known for hosting The Soup (2004–2015) and his role as Jeff Winger on the NBC sitcom Community (2009–2015). He has performed in the films Spider-Man 2 (2004), Spy Kids: All the Time in the World (2011), Ted (2012) and The Happytime Murders (2018). He also starred in the short-lived CBS sitcom The Great Indoors (2016–2017), hosted a reboot of Card Sharks (2019–2021), and portrayed the superhero Sylvester Pemberton / Starman on the show Stargirl (2020–2022). In 2020, he hosted a special aftershow interviewing key subjects from the Netflix documentary series Tiger King and voiced Johnny Cage in the direct-to-video martial arts film Mortal Kombat Legends: Scorpion's Revenge (2020), a role he reprised in the sequel Mortal Kombat Legends: Battle of the Realms (2021). He also voices X-PO in Lego Dimensions (2015–2017) and The Scientist in Fortnite (2021–present).

Early life
McHale was born in Rome on November 20, 1971, the son of Jack McHale, who worked as the Dean of Students at Loyola University's Rome Center, and his wife Laurie. His father is American and is from Chicago, while his mother is Canadian and a native of Vancouver. McHale is of Irish and Norwegian descent, and was raised Catholic. He grew up on Mercer Island, Washington, and briefly lived in Haddonfield, New Jersey, before returning to Mercer Island. He attended Mercer Island High School. He received a bachelor's degree in history from the University of Washington in 1995, and was briefly in the Theta Chi fraternity but left it because he "couldn't stand it."

McHale was recruited to be on the University of Washington's rowing team, but later joined its football team. Though most of his teammates received athletic scholarships, he was a walk-on who played tight end for two years on the scout team without appearing in an actual game. He was part of the Almost Live! cast, a local sketch comedy television show produced by Seattle's KING-TV. From 1993 to 1997, he was a member of the improv comedy group at Unexpected Productions, participating in Theatersports! at the Market Theater located in Pike Place Market in downtown Seattle. He received an MFA from the Professional Actors Training Program at the University of Washington.

Career

Hosting
In 2004, McHale began hosting The Soup, a satirical weekly television show on the E! television network. Throughout the show, he takes the audience through the oddities and ridiculous happenings of the week in television. He frequently appears as a co-host on Loveline. He has been a judge on Iron Chef America. He was involved in the American version of the British TV show The IT Crowd. McHale made a guest appearance on the finale of Last Comic Standings sixth season, when he recapped the show's events in his typical format of jokes made popular on The Soup. He made an appearance as a guest judge on RuPaul's Drag Race season 11, episode 4, "Trump: The Rusical".

McHale was the host at the 2014 White House Correspondents' Association annual dinner. He hosted the 2011 Independent Spirit Awards and the 2015 ESPY Awards. In 2016, he appeared as an occasional co-host alongside Kelly Ripa in the ABC morning show Live with Kelly. McHale hosted the 43rd People's Choice Awards on January 18, 2017, and the 2017 Webby Awards on May 15, 2017. McHale hosted video game developer and publisher Ubisoft's press conference at E3 2010.

In January 2018, it was announced that he would be receiving his own talk show on Netflix in February. The Joel McHale Show with Joel McHale combined celebrity guests, pre-taped sketches and video clips in a half-hour series that focused on pop culture and news from around the world. On August 17, 2018, it was announced that Netflix had canceled the show after 19 episodes, reportedly due to low viewership.

On April 8, 2019, TVLine reported that McHale would host a revival of the game show Card Sharks for ABC. The revival would premiere on June 12 of that year, running for two seasons and 21 episodes until July 7, 2021. The iteration was canceled in April 2022.

Beginning March 27, 2020, McHale co-hosts The Darkest Timeline podcast with former Community co-star Ken Jeong; the podcast was created in response to the ongoing COVID-19 pandemic. Also in 2020, he hosted an after-show special of the Netflix documentary series Tiger King. With Jeong, they became the new hosts of Fox's New Year's Eve special New Year's Eve Toast & Roast. The second edition was canceled due to the quickly rising cases of Omicron variant in the COVID-19 pandemic.

In 2021, McHale hosted Crime Scene Kitchen, also on Fox.

Acting

After earning his master's degree in acting, McHale moved to Los Angeles and landed small roles in Diagnosis: Murder, CSI: Miami, and Will & Grace. He played a TV reporter in the biopic Lords of Dogtown. He guest-starred as a cast member on the NBC improv comedy show Thank God You're Here during the pilot episode and had a guest role on an episode of Pushing Daisies. McHale appeared in Spider-Man 2 in a small role as Mr. Jacks, a bank manager.

McHale has a long association with Circle X Theatre, where he has done several plays. McHale was a weekly guest on The Adam Carolla Show and Mickey and Amelia, and occasional guest on Opie and Anthony. He occasionally appeared on Countdown with Keith Olbermann in a humor sequence closing the show.

McHale starred in the sitcom Community, which premiered in fall 2009, and continued to host The Soup. McHale made an appearance on the first episode of the fifth season of Tosh.0. He played Rex in Ted (2012) and had a short guest stint on the FX show Sons of Anarchy. He played a police officer in the supernatural horror film Deliver Us from Evil. McHale appeared in 3 episodes between the tenth and eleventh seasons of The X-Files in 2016 and 2018, respectively.

McHale played the lead role in the CBS sitcom The Great Indoors, which began airing in the fall of 2016. The series was cancelled on May 13, 2017, due to low ratings.

In 2018, McHale was cast in the recurring role of Chris on the second season of the Netflix horror-comedy series Santa Clarita Diet.

In December 2018, it was announced that McHale was cast as Sylvester Pemberton, the Golden Age Starman in the DC Universe and The CW series Stargirl. After sporadic appearances in its first two seasons, he was upgraded to series regular for the third.

McHale has been a regular guest panelist on The Masked Singer. He first guested in episode four of the first season, then in two episodes of season 2 and episode 8 of season 3. In season 4, he was a guest panelist in episodes 3 and 4, on his first appearance performing Robin Thicke's "Blurred Lines" as the "Robin" (wearing a cut-out face of Robin Thicke). He went on to be a guest panelist in the third episode of season 5 and episode 7 of season 6.

Personal life 
McHale married Sarah Williams in July 1996. They live in the Hollywood Hills with their two sons, Isaac and Eddie. In a 2018 interview on Dax Shepard's podcast Armchair Expert, McHale revealed he was dyslexic, having discovered this when his two sons were diagnosed.

McHale has said that he developed an interest in watches after stylist Jose Camilo got him a Ritmo Mundo watch, which also prompted McHale to buy a Bell & Ross military watch. He now owns 12 watches.

McHale is a fan of the Seattle Seahawks football team and the Los Angeles Gladiators esports team.

Politics and beliefs 
He attends a Presbyterian church and has been supportive of the LGBT community; while performing at the Durham Performing Arts Center, he wore a handmade gay-rights shirt, talked about the bathroom law passed weeks prior, said he was donating all proceeds to the LGBTQ Center of Durham, and would not perform in the state again until the law was overturned. McHale, along with several of his Community castmates, made a campaign video in support of Joe Biden in October 2020 titled "Human Beings for Biden."

Philanthropy 
In 2021, McHale has shown his support for the Children's Tumor Foundation, an organization dedicated to raising awareness for and treating Neurofibromatosis. Some other charities and foundations that McHale has supported include DoSomething.org, Elton John AIDS Foundation, Friar's Foundation, Jonsson Cancer Center Foundation, Make-A-Wish Foundation, Motion Picture & Television Fund, Noreen Fraser Foundation, Screen Actors Guild, The FEED Foundation, The Trevor Project, and UNICEF.

Filmography

Film

Television

Video games

Awards and nominations

Books

References

External links

 
 
 Biography at E! Online

1971 births
Living people
20th-century American comedians
20th-century American male actors
21st-century American comedians
21st-century American male actors
21st-century American male writers
American game show hosts
American infotainers
American male comedians
American male film actors
American male screenwriters
American male television actors
American male television writers
American male voice actors
American people of Canadian descent
American people of Irish descent
American people of Norwegian descent
American philanthropists
American Presbyterians
American stand-up comedians
American television producers
American television writers
Comedians from Washington (state)
Converts to Calvinism from Roman Catholicism
Italian emigrants to the United States
Male actors from Rome
Male actors from Seattle
Mercer Island High School alumni
People from Mercer Island, Washington
People from Seattle
Actors with dyslexia
Screenwriters from Washington (state)
University of Washington College of Arts and Sciences alumni
University of Washington School of Drama alumni
Washington Huskies football players
Writers from Seattle